Amar Singh s/o Ishar Singh (born 6 June 1958) is a Malaysian police officer serving in the Royal Malaysian Police (PDRM). He is the Director of Commercial Criminal Investigation Department (CCID) and has held the post of Kuala Lumpur Police Chief from 14 March 2016 to 5 December 2018.

Early life
Amar holds an LLB from Buckingham University, and Amar also holds a Bachelor of Science and Master in Criminal Justice from the University of Malaya (UM); and Diploma in Shariah Law and Practice from the International International Islamic University Malaysia (IIUM). Amar started his career at the Ipoh district police headquarters after completing the Assistant Superintendent Cadet police policy training in 1983. He later received ranks and held different positions in the police force.  Amar Singh was also the first Punjabi senior police officer to be appointed Commander of The Malaysian Police Training Centre (PULAPOL), Kuala Lumpur Police Chief and Director of Commercial Criminal Investigation Departement.
Raised in a family involved in the field of policing, father Amar, Ishar Singh, joined the Police Federated Malay States in 1939, a year after coming to Malaya from Punjab. According to an English -language news portal, Ishar is a pioneer member of the special police squad team. Datuk Amar, Bachan Singh, was a constable in the early 1900s.
On 25 May 2018, his contract as KL Police Chief was extended. He ended his career as a police officer on 5 December 2018 after three decades of service with the PDRM.

Honours
  :
  Officer of the Order of the Defender of the Realm (K.M.N.) (2007)
  Companion of the Order of Loyalty to the Crown of Malaysia (J.S.M.) (2008)
  Companion of the Order of the Defender of the Realm (J.M.N.) (2017)
 Royal Malaysian Police
 Loyal Commander of the Most Gallant Police Order (PSPP)
 Courageous Commander of the Most Gallant Police Order (PGPP)
  :
  Knight Companion of the Order of the Crown of Pahang (DIMP) – Dato' (2007)
  Grand Knight of the Order of Sultan Ahmad Shah of Pahang (SSAP) – Dato' Sri (2018)
  :
  Knight Commander of the Order of the Loyalty to the Crown of Kelantan (D.P.S.K.) – Dato' (2009)
  :
  Knight Commander of the Order of the Territorial Crown (P.M.W.) – Datuk (2018)

References

Living people
1958 births
Malaysian police officers
Officers of the Order of the Defender of the Realm
Companions of the Order of Loyalty to the Crown of Malaysia
Companions of the Order of the Defender of the Realm
Alumni of the University of Buckingham
University of Malaya alumni